I-181 (originally I-81) was an Imperial Japanese Navy Kaidai-type cruiser submarine of the KD7 sub-class commissioned in 1943. During World War II, she conducted two war patrols, rescued the United States Marine Corps ace Gregory "Pappy" Boyington, and took part in the New Guinea campaign before American warships sank her in January 1944.

Design and description
The submarines of the KD7 sub-class were medium-range attack submarines developed from the preceding KD6 sub-class. They displaced  surfaced and  submerged.

For surface running, the submarines were powered by two  diesel engines, each driving one propeller shaft. When submerged each propeller was driven by a  electric motor.

The submarines were armed with six internal  torpedo tubes, all in the bow. They carried one reload for each tube; a total of a dozen torpedoes. They were originally intended to be armed with two twin-gun mounts for the  Type 96 anti-aircraft gun, but a  deck gun was substituted for one 25 mm mount during construction.

Construction and commissioning
I-181 was laid down as Submarine No. 159 at the Kure Naval Arsenal in Kure, Japan, on 11 November 1941. She later was renamed I-81. She was launched on 2 May 1942 and provisionally attached to the Sasebo Naval District that day. She was renamed I-181 on 20 May 1942, and was both completed and commissioned on 24 May 1943.

Service history

May–September 1943
On the day of her commissioning, I-181 was formally attached to the Sasebo Naval District and assigned to Submarine Squadron 11 in the 1st Fleet, an element of the Combined Fleet, for workups. On 20 August 1943, she was reassigned to Submarine Division 22 in Submarine Squadron 3 in the 6th Fleet, also an element of the Combined Fleet. She departed Kure on 25 August 1943 bound for Truk Atoll in the Caroline Islands, which she reached on 1 September 1943.

First war patrol
On 7 September 1943, I-181 put to sea from Truk to begin her first war patrol, assigned a patrol area off Espiritu Santo in the New Hebrides. While she was on patrol, Submarine Squadron 3 was disbanded on 15 September 1943, and Submarine Division 22 was assigned directly to the 6th Fleet. She moved to the Solomon Islands to patrol in an area off Cape Esperance on the northwestern tip of Guadalcanal. She sighted no enemy ships, and on 30 September 1943 received orders to proceed to a new patrol area in the Torres Strait between southeastern New Guinea and northeastern Australia, which she reached on 2 October 1943. She attacked an Allied convoy twice in the Torres Strait on 14 October 1943, but scored no hits. She concluded her patrol with her return to Truk on 20 October 1943.

Second war patrol
I-181 got underway from Truk for her second war patrol on 11 November 1943, bound for a patrol area off Bougainville in the Solomon Islands. While at sea, she was reassigned to the 8th Fleet, an element of the Southeast Area Fleet, on 12 November 1943. I-181′s patrol concluded with her arrival at Rabaul on New Britain in the Bismarck Archipelago on 29 November 1943.

New Guinea campaign

After her arrival at Rabaul, I-181 was assigned to supply duty in support of Japanese forces fighting on New Guinea in the New Guinea campaign. She set out from Rabaul on her first supply run at 09:30 on 7 December 1943 bound for Sio, New Guinea, with 44 tons of cargo that included two packages of type H ammunition, one package of type U ammunition, four packages of code books, and one package of light globes. She arrived at Sio on 9 December and came under attack by Allied bombers which dropped 15 depth charges, but she crash-dived and avoided damage. She then unloaded her cargo and proceeded to Rabaul, where she arrived at 08:00 on 11 December 1943.

On 14 December 1943, I-181 began her second New Guinea supply run. She unloaded her cargo at Buka on 16 December and got back underway the same day, returning to Rabaul on 18 December 1943. She began her third supply run on 21 December 1943, again bound for Buka, but after arriving at Buka on 22 December was unable to unload her cargo. She returned to Rabaul on 24 December 1943.

I-181 got underway from Rabaul on 28 December 1943 for her fourth supply run, heading for Sio. After delivering the cargo, she received orders to proceed to the waters north of Choiseul in the Solomon Islands to intercept an Allied task force. She did not find the Allied ships, and headed back for Rabaul. I-181 arrived at Rabaul two hours later. After World War II, Boyington said that the best treatment he received while a prisoner-of-war was during his time aboard I-181.

On 6 January 1944, I-181 began her fifth supply run. She unloaded her cargo at Buka on 7 January and headed back to Rabaul, arriving there on 9 January 1944.

With the commander of Submarine Division 22 and his staff embarked, I-181 departed Rabaul on 13 January 1944 on her sixth supply run in company with the submarine , bound for Gali, New Guinea. The Japanese never heard from I-181 again.

Loss
The circumstances of I-181′s loss remain unclear. The Japanese garrison at Gali reported witnessing a running battle in the Vitiaz Strait off Gali on the evening of 16 January 1944 involving I-181 and an unidentified American destroyer and PT boat in which I-181 was depth-charged and sunk with the loss of all on board. Some sources claim U.S. Navy aircraft sank I-181 in St. George's Channel on 16 January 1944.

The submarine submerged and PT-143 dropped two depth charges — set to explode at a depth of  — ahead of the submarine's wake about  bearing 150 degrees True from Gasmata. PT-143′s crew heard a third explosion after the two depth charges detonated,′ but found no evidence that the depth charges damaged the submarine despite searching a  area around the location of the attack until 03:00 on 19 January 1944.

PT-364 dropped one depth  to the north and another  to the north in an attempt to drive the submerged submarine toward the waiting PT-329 and PT-364, but none of the PT boats gained any further contact on the submarine.

On 1 March 1944, the Imperial Japanese Navy declared I-181 to be presumed lost with all 89 men aboard southwest of New Guinea. The Japanese struck her from the Navy List on 30 April 1944.

Notes

References
 
 
 
 

1942 ships
Ships built by Kure Naval Arsenal
Kaidai-class submarines
World War II submarines of Japan
Maritime incidents in January 1944
World War II shipwrecks in the Pacific Ocean
Ships lost with all hands
Japanese submarines lost during World War II
Submarines sunk by United States warships